Yaverlestes gassoni is an extinct mammal which dates to the early Cretaceous period, 130 million years ago. It is part of the Wessex Formation from the Isle of Wight, England. The holotype, BMNH M 54386, is a partial jaw discovered near Yaverland.

The genus name, Yaverlestes, is derived from Yaverland, the location of its discovery, and lestes, Greek for thief. The specific epithet, gassoni, is in honour of Brian Gasson, its discoverer.

References

Early Cretaceous mammals of Europe
Prehistoric mammal genera